Richelieu Rock (called Hin Plo Naam in Thai) is a dive site in Thailand in the Andaman Sea about 200 km northwest of Phuket. It is part of the Mu Koh Surin marine park although being about 18 km east of Surin Island.

The horseshoe-shaped reef discovered by Jacques-Yves Cousteau is known for its purple corals as well as diverse marine life ranging from small fish and harlequin shrimp to large pelagics like whale shark, manta ray, barracuda, and grouper.

Discovery and name
There are many stories about the naming of Richelieu Rock - many of which are demonstrably false.
One such story is Richelieu Rock was discovered as a recreational scuba dive site by diving pioneer, Jacques-Yves Cousteau, with the help of local fishermen.  The problem with this however is Cousteau never came far enough north during his visit to Thailand.  On his Andaman expedition he came as far north as Koh Bon island whilst waiting a permit for Myanmar (which was never granted) and no further.

The origin of the name is disputed. Some say it was named by Cousteau after the red colour of Cardinal Richelieu's robe due to the red to purple colours of the soft corals on the reef. Others claim it was named after General Richelieu, a commander in the Royal Thai Navy. This theory is supported by the existence of official Navy maps mentioning Richelieu Rock from the early 1900s, predating Cousteau's first visit to Thailand, in 1989....  Other evidence supporting this story are the fact that Richelieu was the first person to complete a hydrographic survey of the Andaman Sea including the area in question.

Location
There are no islands in the immediate vicinity of the reef.

Marine life
Partly due to its unique geology as a solitary pinnacle standing out from around 30m. depth to just under the surface it is said to attract a variety of different pelagic species of all different sizes. Reports claim regular appearance of Snappers, Bannerfish, Lionfish, Triggerfish and Shovelnose Rays.

Several sources also report sightings of filter feeders like manta rays and whale sharks, scavengers such as barracudas though fishing is said to have made their appearance less frequent.

Richelieu Rock is also well known for its large variety of small and rare marine critters, such as sea horses, frogfish, harlequin shrimp, pineapplefish, orang utang crab and several other species of crabs and shrimp.

Dive site 

Richelieu Rock is considered by some to be one of Thailand's most iconic dive sites. It is usually accessed by live-aboard diving boats during cruises, as it is too far off the coast to be reached by usual dive boats, though there are speedboats that can go to Richelieu Rock as a daytrip.

Richelieu Rock is part of the Surin National Marine Park and is closed from 15 May until 15 October each year.

Depth
The limestone pinnacle rises from the sea floor depth of about 50 m. up to the surface at low tide.

References

External links 
 
 padi.com

Andaman Sea
Tourism in Thailand
Diving in Thailand